Jiaxing Airport, or Jiaxing Air Base, is a military air base in the city of Jiaxing in Zhejiang province, China.  It is being converted to a dual-use military and civilian airport.  The airport is located 8 kilometers from the city center in Xiuzhou District.  Due to Jiaxing Airport's proximity to both Shanghai and Hangzhou, it is touted as "Shanghai's third airport" and "Hangzhou's second airport".  The airport is designed to handle 500,000 passengers annually.Jiaxing Airport is expected to be officially operational in 2025.

Facilities 
Jiaxing Airport will be a class 4E airport when completed. Jiaxing Airport is planned to have one 3,400 meter long runway and a 25,700 square-meter terminal building. The airport will be able to accommodate Boeing 747 and Airbus A340 aircraft.

See also
List of airports in China
List of the busiest airports in China
List of People's Liberation Army Air Force airbases

References

Airports in Zhejiang
Chinese Air Force bases
Proposed airports in China
Jiaxing